Itajutinga difficilis is a species of beetle in the family Cerambycidae, the only species in the genus Itajutinga.

References

Acanthoderini